Charles George Horetzky or Horetsky (20 July 1838 – 30 April 1900) was a Canadian surveyor and photographer noted for his work in western Canada as a member of the Canadian Pacific Survey under Sir Sandford Fleming and Frank Moberly.

Works

External links 

1838 births
1900 deaths
Canadian photographers
Canadian people of Ukrainian descent